Joseph P. Kelly (January 6, 1894 – September 2, 1968) was an American politician from New York.

Early life
He was born on January 6, 1894, in New York.

Career 
Kelly was appointed on February 16, 1955, by Governor W. Averell Harriman as New York State Commissioner of Motor Vehicles. He remained in office until March 1959. 

On June 1, 1961, he was nominated by President John F. Kennedy as Collector of the Port of New York. He was confirmed by the U.S. Senate, and took office on July 5, 1961. Kelly was the last person to hold this office which was abolished in 1966 when the structure of the United States Customs Service was changed.

Death 
He died on September 2, 1968, in the St. Joseph's Manor nursing home in Trumbull, Connecticut.

See also
 Chester A. Arthur

Sources

1894 births
1968 deaths
Politicians from the Bronx
New York (state) Democrats
Collectors of the Port of New York
People from Trumbull, Connecticut